Q'illu Urqu (Quechua q'illu yellow, urqu mountain, "yellow mountain", also spelled Khellu Orkho, Quellu Orco) is a mountain in the Potosí mountain range of the Bolivian Andes, about 4,960 m (16,273  ft) high. It is situated south east of Potosí in the Potosí Department. Q'illu Urqu lies southwest of Illimani at Challwiri Lake and near  Q'illu Q'asa.

References 

Mountains of Potosí Department